Caroline Dahl is an American pianist and composer of boogie-woogie and American roots music.

She is originally from Louisville, Kentucky, where she played with the Metropolitan Blues All Stars. She has lived in San Francisco for more than 30 years, where she performs solo around the Bay area and with Tom Rigney & Flambeau. She also performed frequently for more than 25 years at Sunday brunches at Mama's Royal Café (now closed) in Mill Valley.  Dahl is also an award-winning fiber artist.

The American Music Research Foundation calls Dahl "a self-taught master of the American roots styles of Boogie woogie, Blues, vintage R&B, Jazz, Swing, and Country Swing." She has headlined at festivals in the United States, Europe and Canada, including the International Boogie Woogie Festival in Switzerland, the Festival de Blues in Barcelona, and the Motor City Boogie Woogie Festival in Detroit.

Discography
 2005: No Hats (Globe Records)
 2006: Night House (Globe Records)
 2013: Devil Digit Boogie Woogie (Hexadact Records)
 2021:  A 'Boogie Woogie State of Mind' (Hexadact Records)

References

External links
 Caroline Dahl website
 Globe Records website
 Tom Rigney website
 Swanee River Boogie Woogie by Caroline Dahl, San Francisco 

Living people
Boogie-woogie pianists
21st-century American pianists
Year of birth missing (living people)